Akh Kand may refer to:
 Akh Kand, Divandarreh
 Akh Kand, Saqqez

See also
 Aqkand (disambiguation)